is a Japanese entertainer, actor, musician, and singer who is represented by the talent agencies Heart Cleaning Company, then Flos. His nicknamed Jick (stylized as JICK) from his surname. Along with Seiji Katsu, he was a member of Kodomo Band.

Filmography

TV series

Films

References

External links
Official profile 

Japanese entertainers
Japanese male actors
Japanese male singers
1957 births
Living people
Musicians from Setagaya